Sergio Kleiner (born March 23, 1939 in Buenos Aires, Argentina), also credited as Sergio Klainer, is an Argentine-born Mexican film and television actor.

He started his acting career at the age of 21 at a play in Buenos Aires. He then toured with the theater company to Central America and Mexico where he obtained a role in Los padres terribles of Jean Cocteau the following year (1962).

In 1968 he obtained his first roles in telenovelas in Mujeres sin amor and Juventud divino tesoro both with Irma Lozano. The same year he obtained his first starring role in Fando y Lis, a film by Alejandro Jodorowsky. Three years later he participated in the classic La generala starred by María Félix. In 1984 he played a doctor in "Ya nunca más" one of the films starred by singer Luis Miguel. He would spend the next decade acting in Televisa when in 1998 he moved to rival network TV Azteca to act in La casa del naranjo and six more telenovelas in the next seven years. In 2005 he returned to film with the movie Morirse está en Hebreo.

Films

 Morirse está en Hebreo (2005) as Moishe
 Ni de aquí, ni de allá (1988) as a spy
 Ya nunca más (1984) as a doctor
 Bloody Marlene (1979) as McCutchen's son
 Cinco mil dólares de recompensa (1974)
 Los doce malditos (1974)
 Fin de fiesta (1972) as Luis
 Apolinar (1972)
 / The Incredible Invasion (1971) as an alien
 Mictlan/La casa de los que ya no son (1969)
 Las reglas del juego (1971) as El Güero
 Siempre hay una primera vez (segment Isabel, 1971)
 La generala (1971) as El rubio
 Fando y Lis (1968) as Fando

Stage
Rainman (2010)
 Mi querida familia La malquerida Una esfingue llamada cordelia Soledad para cuatro Viento en las ramas del sasafras El presidente mañoso El gesticulador La vida es sueño La ronda de la hechizada Los dolores El pájaro azul Los padres terribles (1962)

Telenovelas

TV Azteca

 Tanto Amor (2015) as Óscar Lombardo
 La Otra Cara del Alma (2012-2013) as Padre Ernesto
 La Mujer de Judas (2011-2012) as Buenaventura Briceño
 Cielo Rojo (2011) as Ángel Durán 
 Entre el Amor y el Deseo (2010) as Sergio
 Quiéreme Tonto (2010)
 Ni una vez más (2005)
 Amor en Custodia (2005) as Santiago Achaval Urien
 Te amaré en silencio (2003) as Arsenio
 La hija del jardinero (2003) as Lic. Ordóñez
 Golpe bajo (2000) as Gonzalo Montaño
 El amor no es como lo pintan (2000) as Manuel Segovia
 Catalina y Sebastian (1999) as Gustavo Negrete
 La casa del naranjo (1998)

Televisa
 LA Rosa de Guadalupe (2016) as Felipe 
 Salud, dinero y amor (1997) as Dr. Damián Zárate
 Canción de amor (1996)
 Más allá del puente (1994) as Adrián
 De frente al sol (1992) as Adrián
 Muchachitas (1991) as Alberto
 Alcanzar una estrella (1990) as Fernando
 Dulce desafío (1989)
 Seducción (1986)
 Eclipse (1984) as Atilio Greco
 Elisa (1979)
 Lucia Sombra (1971) as Aaron Siavinski
 Mi amor por ti (1969)
 Los caudillos (1968) as Count Pablo Jovellanos
 Juventud divino tesoro (1968)
 Mujeres sin amor'' (1968)

See also
Foreign-born artists in Mexico

External links
 Sergio Kleiner at the telenovela database
 

Argentine male film actors
Argentine male telenovela actors
Male actors from Buenos Aires
1936 births
Living people
Argentine emigrants to Mexico
Argentine people of German-Jewish descent
Jewish Argentine male actors